The 1988 Major League Baseball postseason was the playoff tournament of Major League Baseball for the 1988 season. The winners of each division advance to the postseason and face each other in a League Championship Series to determine the pennant winners that face each other in the World Series. 

In the National League, the New York Mets returned to the postseason for the second time in three years, and the Los Angeles Dodgers returned to the postseason for the fourth and final time this decade. In the American League, the Oakland Athletics returned to the postseason for the first time since 1981, and the Boston Red Sox also returned for the second time in three years.

The playoffs began on October 4, 1988, and concluded on October 20, 1988, with the Dodgers shocking the Athletics in five games in the 1988 World Series. The series was notable for injured Dodger Kirk Gibson's dramatic pinch-hit walk-off home run off Athletics closer Dennis Eckersley in Game 1. It was the second title in nine years for the Dodgers, and their sixth overall.

Playoff seeds
The following teams qualified for the postseason:

American League
 Boston Red Sox - 89–73, Clinched AL East
 Oakland Athletics - 104–58, Clinched AL West

National League
 New York Mets - 100–60, Clinched NL East
 Los Angeles Dodgers - 94–67, Clinched NL West

Playoff bracket

American League Championship Series

Boston Red Sox vs. Oakland Athletics

This was a rematch of the 1975 ALCS, which the Red Sox won in a sweep over the Athletics, ending their hopes for a fourth consecutive title. This time, Oakland would sweep Boston, and return to the World Series for the first time since 1974.

Despite ending in a sweep, each game of the series was decided by four runs or less. Rick Honeycutt helped keep the Red Sox offense at bay in Game 1 as the Athletics narrowly prevailed. The Athletics won by one run again in Game 2, as in the top of the ninth, singles by Ron Hassey, Tony Phillips, and Walt Weiss scored Hassey to break a 3-3 tie and put the A's up for good. When the series moved to Oakland, the Athletics prevailed in a Game 3 slugfest, 10-6, to go up 3-0 in the series. Dave Stewart and ace closer Dennis Eckersley held the Red Sox to just one run in Game 4 as the Athletics completed the sweep and secured the pennant.

The Red Sox would return to the postseason in 1990, but were swept by the Athletics in the ALCS yet again. This was the first of three consecutive AL pennants won by the Athletics. The next year, they defeated the Toronto Blue Jays in five games, and in 1990 they again defeated the Red Sox in a sweep.

National League Championship Series

Los Angeles Dodgers vs. New York Mets

This was the first postseason meeting between the Mets and Dodgers. The Dodgers upset the heavily favored Mets in seven games and returned to the World Series for the first time since 1981. 

In Los Angeles, the first two games were split by both teams - the Mets overcame a 2-0 Dodgers lead in the top of the ninth to win by a 3-2 score in Game 1, and in Game 2, the Dodgers drove Mets' starting pitcher David Cone from the mound after scoring the game's first five runs, winning 6-3 to even the series. When the series moved to Queens for Game 3, the Mets overcame a late Dodgers lead with a five-run eighth inning to win and go up 2-1 in the series. The Dodgers prevailed in an ugly 12-inning Game 4 by one run thanks to a solo home run from Kirk Gibson to tie the series at two. The Dodgers fended off a late rally by the Mets in Game 5 to take a 3-2 series lead headed back to Los Angeles. The Mets won Game 6 by a 5-1 score thanks to a complete game performance from Cone to force a seventh game. In Game 7, Orel Hershiser, despite being on three days rest, led the Dodgers to the pennant with a complete game shutout in Game 7, 6-0. 

This was the first time that the Mets lost in the NLCS. This would be the last postseason appearance for the Mets until 1999. This was the last time the Dodgers won the NL pennant until 2017, where they defeated the Chicago Cubs in five games en route to the World Series.

The Mets and Dodgers would meet two more times in the postseason, in the NLDS in 2006, and 2015, with the Mets winning both times.

1988 World Series

Oakland Athletics (AL) vs. Los Angeles Dodgers (NL) 

The 1988 World Series was the second to feature two teams from California. It was also a rematch of the 1974 World Series, which the Athletics won in five games en route to a three-peat. This time, the Dodgers shocked the heavily-favored Athletics in five games to win their sixth championship in franchise history. 

The series was notable for injured Dodger Kirk Gibson's dramatic pinch-hit walk-off home run off Athletics closer Dennis Eckersley in Game 1. Orel Hershiser pitched a three-hit complete game shutout in Game 2 as the Dodgers blew out the Athletics, 6-0, to take a 2-0 series lead headed to Oakland. The Athletics would take Game 3 off a walk-off home run from Mark McGwire to avoid a sweep, but that would be their only win of the series. Dodgers' relief pitcher Jay Howell held off a late comeback by the Athletics in Game 4 to preserve a one-run Dodgers victory and take a commanding 3-1 series lead. In Game 5, the Dodgers jumped out to an early lead in the first inning and maintained it, thanks to stellar pitching from Hershiser, who pitched another complete game in a 5-2 Dodger victory. Hershiser got the final out by striking out Tony Phillips, as the Dodgers clinched the title in Oakland.

The Athletics would return to the World Series the very next year, and swept the San Francisco Giants in another all-California matchup. This would be the last postseason appearance by the Dodgers until 1995. It would also be the last World Series appearance for the Dodgers until 2017, where they lost to the Houston Astros in seven games. The Dodgers’ next title would come in 2020, where they defeated the Tampa Bay Rays in six games.

References

External links
 League Baseball Standings & Expanded Standings - 1988

 
Major League Baseball postseason